Trans-2,3-dihydro-3-hydroxyanthranilate isomerase (phzF (gene)) is an enzyme with systematic name (5S,6S)-6-amino-5-hydroxycyclohexane-1,3-diene-1-carboxyate isomerase. This enzyme catalyses the following chemical reaction

 (5S,6S)-6-amino-5-hydroxycyclohexane-1,3-diene-1-carboxyate  (1R,6S)-6-amino-5-oxocyclohex-2-ene-1-carboxylate

The enzyme is involved in phenazine biosynthesis.

References

External links 
 

EC 5.3.3